Ichthyosis acquisita is a disorder clinically and histologically similar to ichthyosis vulgaris.

Presentation

Associated conditions
The development of ichthyosis in adulthood can be a manifestation of systemic disease, and it has been described in association with malignancies, drugs, endocrine and metabolic disease, HIV, infection, and autoimmune conditions.

It usually is associated with people who have Hodgkin's disease but it is also occurs in people with mycosis fungoides, other malignant sarcomas, Kaposi's sarcoma and visceral carcinomas. It can occur in people with leprosy, AIDS, tuberculosis, and typhoid fever.

See also
 Ichthyosis
 Confluent and reticulated papillomatosis of Gougerot and Carteaud
 List of cutaneous conditions

References

External links 

Immune system disorders
Lymphoid-related cutaneous conditions